The Liebermann reagent named after Hungarian chemist Leo Liebermann (1852-1926) is used as a simple spot-test to presumptively identify alkaloids as well as other compounds. It is composed of a mixture of potassium nitrite and concentrated sulfuric acid. 1 g of potassium nitrite is used for every 10 mL of sulfuric acid. Potassium nitrite may also be substituted by sodium nitrite.  It is used to test for cocaine, morphine, PMA and PMMA.

The test is performed by scraping off a small amount of the substance and adding a drop of the reagent (which is initially clear and colorless).  The results are analyzed by viewing the color of the resulting mixture, and by the time taken for the change in color to become apparent.

See also
Drug checking
 Liebermann–Burchard test
 Dille–Koppanyi reagent
Folin's reagent
Froehde reagent
Mandelin reagent
Marquis reagent
Mecke reagent
Simon's reagent
 Zwikker reagent

References

Chemical tests
Analytical reagents
Drug testing reagents